Born and Raised is the fifth studio album by American singer-songwriter John Mayer, released on May 22, 2012, by Columbia Records. It marked yet another change in Mayer's musical style, incorporating elements of folk and Americana, as well as influences from Bob Dylan, Neil Young, David Crosby, Stephen Stills, and Graham Nash. Its cover, as well as that of the single "Queen of California", was designed by David Adrian Smith.

Born and Raised received generally positive reviews from critics, who praised Mayer's technical skills as well as Don Was' production work.  The first single "Shadow Days" was released on Mayer's blog on February 27, 2012, and was made available for purchase as a digital download on March 6, 2012. The second single "Queen of California" impacted Hot AC radio on August 13, 2012, and the third single "Something Like Olivia" impacted Triple A radio on November 5, 2012.

Background
Mayer has stated that he began to gravitate towards new "musical ideals" during the Winter leg of the Battle Studies World Tour, and he credits listening to records by Bob Dylan and Crosby, Stills, Nash & Young (namely, the Neil Young album After the Gold Rush), as well as other Americana, as influential for this. He has expressed minor frustration at not being able to begin new musical pursuits as soon as he would have liked, due to commitments to complete the touring for Battle Studies.

Upon finishing the tour, and experiencing a backlash for controversial comments made in a Playboy interview, Mayer decided to step away from the media and out of the public eye for a while.

Early reports indicated that the follow-up to Battle Studies would be called Born and Raised and would be released in October 2011.

On September 16, 2011, Mayer posted on his blog that his new record, Born and Raised, was being delayed due to granulomas discovered in his throat. The granulomas were found next to the vocal chords and were treatable. Mayer described this as a "temporary setback" and that recording and mixing of Born and Raised was entirely finished except for a few remaining vocal tracks. He expected the album to be out in early 2012. He told, "I did a lot of therapy, like anti-acid reflux, and it didn’t work, then I went on vocal rest. No alcohol. No spicy food. No talking. Most of September I wasn’t talking at all. I’d have a Bluetooth keyboard, and someone would have an iPad to read what I type. I had to point to menus at restaurants. People look at me like I’m crazy."

On October 20, 2011, Mayer updated his fans about the treatment of his throat granuloma, announcing that he "had surgery this afternoon to remove it and am now on complete vocal rest for a month or more", during which he plans to "travel the country, look, and listen." Recovering from surgery, and after taking a road trip with friends through Middle America, Mayer moved to Bozeman, Montana.

On February 27, 2012, the first single from Born and Raised, "Shadow Days", was released. On February 28, 2012, Mayer released the track listing for the album and announced that Born and Raised would be released on May 22, 2012.

Promotion
Promotion for Born and Raised was hampered by the return of his throat granuloma, and thus he was limited to only interviews. Mainstream promotion included interviews on Late Night with Jimmy Fallon and The Ellen DeGeneres Show, in which he described Born and Raised as his most "honest" and "cohesive" album. He also appeared as a musical guest on the Late Show with David Letterman, playing guitar with the house band. On May 10, 2012, the Clive Davis Theater hosted An Evening with John Mayer in which Mayer discussed Born and Raised and his career.

Touring
In September 2011, Mayer was forced to cancel a small run of live dates upon the discovery of a throat granuloma. In spring 2012, he was scheduled to tour North America, but was forced to cancel the tour after being informed by doctors that his throat granuloma had returned. He has said that he is to undergo surgery again, but that he has "no choice but to take an indefinite break from live performing."

On January 16, 2013, Mayer performed on stage for the first time since April 1, 2011. He was joined by David Ryan Harris, Sean Hurley, Aaron Sterling, Ben Bullington, and Lil Jane & The Pistol Whips at the Emerson Theater in Bozeman, Montana. The concert was part of a benefit organized to help firefighters who battled the previous summer's Pine Creek Fire.

The Born and Raised World Tour began on July 6, 2013, in Milwaukee, Wisconsin. In November 2013, Mayer enjoyed the number one Boxscore on the Billboard chart, grossing a $2.3 million box-office from his first concert appearance in Brazil on September 19. The sold-out performance at São Paulo's Arena Anhembi had more than 30,000 in attendance.

Reception

Commercial performance
Born and Raised was John Mayer's third number one album on the Billboard 200 in the United States, selling 219,000 units in its first week. The following week, it was again placed at the top spot, being Mayer's first album to spend more than a week in the top spot on the chart. In Canada, the album debuted at number one, selling 17,800 copies, making it Mayer's first number one album in Canada. The album also entered the UK album charts at number four.
On September 12, 2012, Born and Raised was certified Gold by the RIAA, selling 500,000 copies. As of December 6, 2012, the album had sold 514,000 copies.

Critical reception
The album garnered generally positive reviews. The album was listed at #17 on Rolling Stones list of the top 50 albums of 2012, saying "It's a shot at redemption that's as on target as anything he's done." People magazine stated, "This is a shimmering album, perfect for taking on the road in the glow of spring and summer."  Billboard called the album "his most consistently satisfying release yet."  Entertainment Weekly gave the album a "B," saying that the Laurel Canyon-inspired, "ramble-tamble style suits him."

Track listing

PersonnelMusical personnelJohn Mayer – vocals, guitars, harmonica, keyboards, percussion, production
Sean Hurley – bass guitar
Aaron Sterling – drums, percussion
Chuck Leavell – keyboardsPrimary production personnelDon Was – production
Chad Franscoviak – engineering
Michael Brauer – mixing
Manny Marroquin – mixing
Martin Pradler – digital editing
Bob Ludwig – masteringFeatured artistsChris Botti – trumpet on "Walt Grace's Submarine Test, January 1967"
David Crosby – vocals on "Born and Raised"
Jim Keltner – drums on "Something Like Olivia"
Greg Leisz – pedal steel guitar on "Queen of California", "Shadow Days", "Whiskey, Whiskey, Whiskey", "Born and Raised (Reprise)"; lap steel guitar on "Born and Raised"
Graham Nash – vocals on "Born and Raised"
Sara Watkins – vocals and violin on "A Face to Call Home"Additional production personnelTravis McGehee – engineering/mixing assistance
Phil Joly – engineering assistance
Pete Bischoff – engineering assistance
Ian Shea – engineering assistance
Jared Nugent – engineering assistance
Scott Smith – engineering assistance
Chris Owens – engineering assistance
Chris Claypool – engineering assistance
Patrick Spain – engineering assistance
Ryan Gilligan – mixing assistance
Chris Calland – mixing assistanceAdditional personnel'''
David A. Smith – artwork
Danny Clinch – photography
Roger Love – vocal consultant

Charts

Weekly charts

Year-end charts

Certifications

Release history

External linksBorn and Raised'' at Metacritic

References

2012 albums
John Mayer albums
Albums produced by Don Was
Albums recorded at Electric Lady Studios